Dávid Pál (born 23 September 1993 in Nagykanizsa) is a Hungarian striker who currently plays for FC Ajka.

External links 
 HLSZ 
 MLSZ 

1993 births
Living people
People from Nagykanizsa
Hungarian footballers
Association football defenders
Zalaegerszegi TE players
Vasas SC players
FC Ajka players
Nemzeti Bajnokság I players
Sportspeople from Zala County